= Heineken House =

Coordinates: 53°04′31″N 8°48′39″E

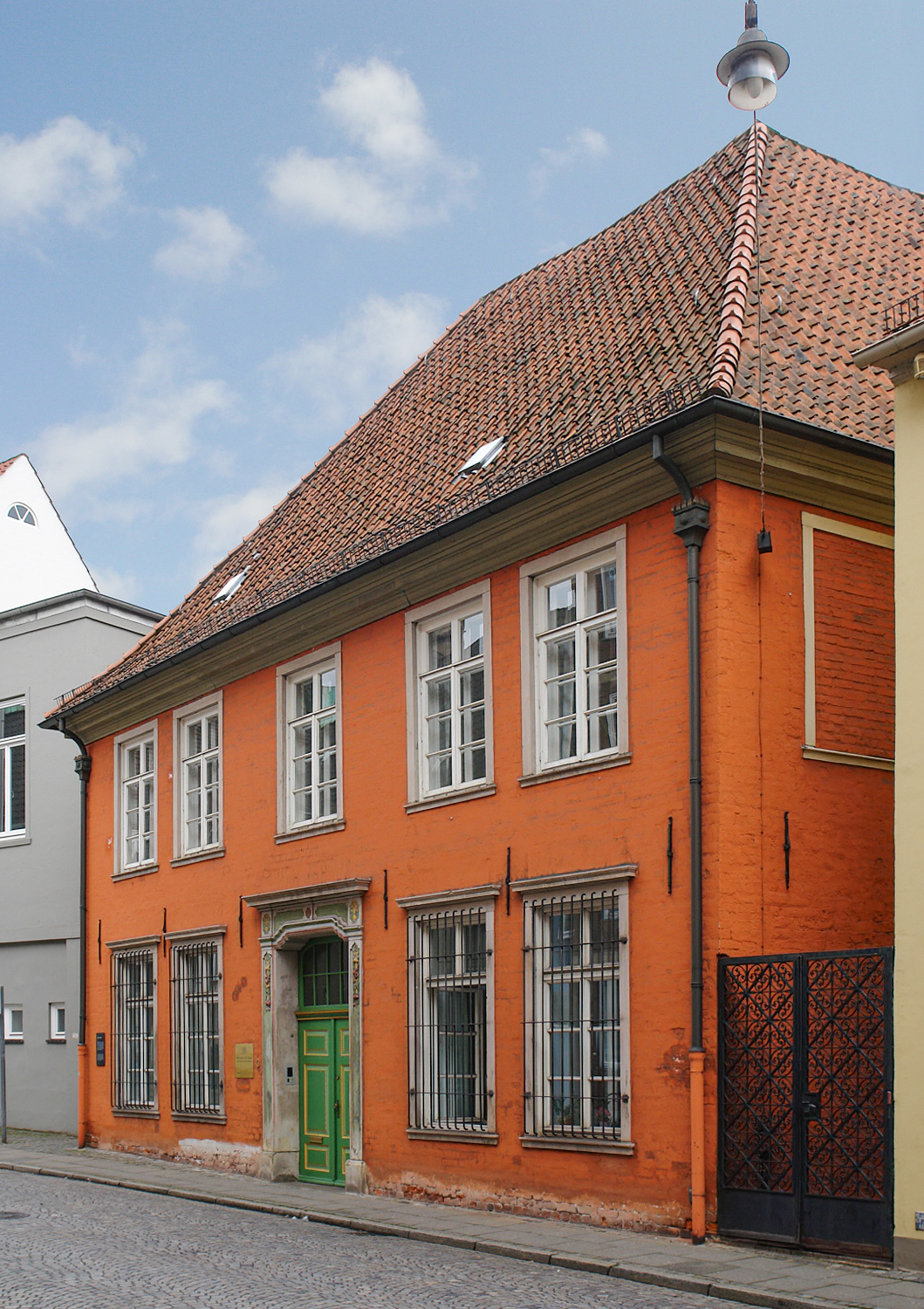
- The house
- Location: Sandstraße 3, Bremen

The Heineken House (German: Haus Heineken) is a historic building in Bremen, Germany. The house has Bremen's oldest painted wooden ceiling. The building's exterior dates from the 18th century but its core is medieval.

== History ==
The Heineken House was renovated in 1579 and the following year received what is now Bremen's oldest wooden painted roof. The 1570 date is known from extant documentation but it is underwritten by dendrochronology which has dated the timbers in the house. The building's exterior dates from 1744.

Heineken House gets its name from mayor Christian Abraham Heineken, an early owner. In 1803 Bremen was divided into four areas and each of these had a mayor. Heineken was one of those mayors who became involved in the defortification of the town.

Since 1974, the Heineken House has been the headquarters of the State Office for Historic Monuments (Landesamt für Denkmalpflege). This saved the building from commercial development.

In 2014, an information plaque was added to the wall of the Heineken House. It is linked by QR code to this article.
